The Landing Masonry Bridge, also designated Bridge 44.53, is a  stone structure built in 1907 by the Delaware, Lackawanna and Western Railroad in Landing, New Jersey, United States. Located 44.53 miles up the rail line from Hoboken Terminal, the bridge carries the two-lane Morris County Route 631 (Landing Road) over the Morristown Line and Montclair-Boonton Line railroad tracks maintained by New Jersey Transit, and sits several hundred feet north of NJT's Lake Hopatcong Station. Now deteriorated and structurally deficient, it is to be replaced with a four-lane bridge by NJT and the New Jersey Department of Transportation.

History 

In the late 1800s, a pony truss bridge carried Landing Road over the Morris Canal (eastern span) and the DL&W mainline (western span). The steel, cable-stayed structure had two towers to support it, with stairs to the station below. The structure also had two pony truss sidings.

In 1907 and 1908, the truss bridge was replaced by Landing Masonry Bridge, a stone structure whose two arches mirrored the older spans. It also carried tracks for the Morris County Traction Company trolleys. The train station sat just north of the bridge's central pier. The older bridge survived for about three years as a pedestrian route to the train station. 

In 1910, the DL&W began building a new Lake Hopatcong Station south of the bridges in anticipation of the opening of the Lackawanna Cut-Off to the north. Completed for $28,500, and opened on May 28, 1911, the new station had a main building on Landing Road and two large pedestrian towers. This rendered the old bridge completely redundant, and it was eventually demolished.

The Landing Masonry Bridge continued to be used by automobiles along Mount Arlington Road and Old Netcong Road. By 1925, parts of the Morris Canal were filled in during construction of Station Road under the old bridge, allowing access to the new station. The use of the Morris Canal ended in 1924, and in the next five years, it was filled in by different structures.

Currently, Lake Hopatcong Station's 96-space parking lot runs under the eastern arch.

Planned replacement 

The Landing Masonry Bridge was rebuilt and rehabilitated in 1972.

Now traversed by Morris County Route 631, it has severely deteriorated. The bridge has become incapable of holding the current and future traffic loads along Landing Road from Interstate 80 and Sussex County, and along with the aging bridge geometry, the stone masonry is beginning to develop cracks. The bridge was given a 19% sufficiency rating and deemed structurally deficient by the United States Department of Transportation.

In its 2010 Capital Program, the New Jersey Department of Transportation laid out a plan to replace the bridge with a four-lane one, with help from the Morris County Highway Department. The plan would shift Landing Road and add a traffic light. Morris County officials say the changes will be made with community input. The New Jersey Turnpike Authority was to give $800,000 during 2010 for design, $750,000 for right-of-way acquisition in 2011 and $6.575 million in fiscal year 2012 to build it.

See also 
Lake Hopatcong

References

External links
2007 photos of the bridge

Delaware, Lackawanna and Western Railroad bridges
NJ Transit Rail Operations
Bridges in Morris County, New Jersey
Road bridges in New Jersey
Morris Canal
Lackawanna Cut-Off
Roxbury Township, New Jersey
Stone bridges in the United States
Arch bridges in the United States